Galerías Pacífico is a shopping centre in Buenos Aires, Argentina, located at the intersection of Florida Street and Córdoba Avenue.

Overview
The Beaux Arts building was designed by the architects Emilio Agrelo and Roland Le Vacher in 1889 to accommodate a shop called the Argentine Bon Marché, modelled on the Le Bon Marché in Paris.

In 1896 part of the building was transformed into the first home for the Museo Nacional de Bellas Artes and in 1908 the British-owned Buenos Aires and Pacific railway company acquired part of the building for offices.  The company's name derived from the fact that its intention was to operate a train service linking Buenos Aires and Valparaíso in Chile, thereby giving access to the Pacific Ocean. From that time onwards the building became known as Edificio Pacífico.

Torture chamber 
In 1987, a film crew uncovered an abandoned torture center in the basement of the building that had been used during the Dirty War.

See also

Harrods Buenos Aires

References

External links
 Catalogue of Monuments
 Galerías Pacífico Pics

Shopping malls in Buenos Aires
National Historic Monuments of Argentina
Torture in Argentina
Commercial buildings completed in 1889
Shopping malls established in 1991
San Nicolás, Buenos Aires
1991 establishments in Argentina